The discography of Stereolab, an English-French rock band, comprises thirteen studio albums, seven compilation albums, fifteen extended plays, sixteen singles, and twenty-three rarities compilations. Release dates listed are earliest worldwide.

Albums

Studio albums

Mini-LPs

Compilations

EPs

The UK chart position for "The Free Design" represents sales on 7" only. Because chart rules at the time limited singles to three tracks, the CD and 12" formats were considered an album for chart purposes and reached #6 on the Budget Albums chart.

Singles

Music videos

Rarities

References

Discography
Discographies of British artists
Stereolab